Kachevan (Käsewän) is a rural locality (a village) in Karmaskalinsky Selsoviet, Karmaskalinsky District, Bashkortostan, Russia. The population was 104 as of 2010. There are 3 streets.

Geography 
Kachevan is located 11 km southwest of Karmaskaly (the district's administrative centre) by road. Beryozovka is the nearest rural locality.

References 

Rural localities in Karmaskalinsky District